Banner Township is a township in Jackson County, Kansas, USA.  As of the 2000 census, its population was 300. The southernmost part of the township is located within the Prairie Band Potawatomi Indian Reservation.

Geography
Banner Township covers an area of 36.02 square miles (93.28 square kilometers); of this, 0.25 square miles (0.65 square kilometers) or 0.7 percent is water.

Adjacent townships
 Jefferson Township (north)
 Liberty Township (northeast)
 Franklin Township (east)
 Lincoln Township (south)
 Grant Township (west)
 Soldier Township (northwest)

Cemeteries
The township contains one cemetery, Hass.

Major highways
 K-16

References
 U.S. Board on Geographic Names (GNIS)
 United States Census Bureau cartographic boundary files

External links
 US-Counties.com
 City-Data.com

Townships in Jackson County, Kansas
Townships in Kansas